Felice Boscaratti (1721 in Verona – 1807) was an Italian painter. A pupil of the Rotari, he soon became established as a painter and teacher. He moved to Vicenza but also worked in his birthplace of Verona - his works at the latter include Saints Ignazio and Bonaventura in the cappella Canossa a S. Bernardino. His works were reproduced by engravers such as Domenico Cunego.

Sources

Felice Boscaratti on artnet
 http://www.verona.com/it/Veronesi-Illustri/Felice-Boscaratti/

1721 births
1807 deaths
18th-century Italian painters
Italian male painters
19th-century Italian painters
Painters from Verona
19th-century Italian male artists
18th-century Italian male artists